Zeelandic Flanders  is the southernmost region of the province of Zeeland in the south-western Netherlands. It lies south of the Western Scheldt that separates the region from the remainder of Zeeland and the Netherlands to the north. Zeelandic Flanders is bordered to the south and to the east by Belgium.

Geography

Zeelandic Flanders is the north-eastern part of the large historical region of Flanders which today lies mostly in Belgium. It shares a land border with the Belgian provinces of East and West Flanders. It is a latitudinally oriented strip of land along the Western Scheldt, a North Sea estuary, and has no land access to the rest of the Netherlands.

The region is bordered by the Zwin nature reserve in the West and the Drowned Land of Saeftinghe in the East.

Since local government boundary reforms in 2003, Zeelandic Flanders has consisted of only three municipalities: Sluis in the west, Terneuzen in the centre and Hulst in the east.

Transport
Zeelandic Flanders is connected to Zuid-Beveland to the north by the Western Scheldt Tunnel, the tunnel goes underneath the Western Scheldt (estuary). The tunnel arrives 18 km east of Flushing on the Zuid-Beveland peninsula. Before the tunnel there used to be 2 car ferries that connected Zeelandic Flanders to other parts of Zeeland, one ferry from Perkpolder to Kruiningen on Zuid-Beveland and the second one from Breskens to Flushing on Walcheren, this last ferry still exists nowadays but can only be used by pedestrians and cyclists.

The Ghent–Terneuzen Canal passes through Zeelandic Flanders.

A freight railway line connects Terneuzen to Gent-Dampoort railway station.

History
Except for some formerly insular areas, the region now called Zeelandic Flanders was not part of the historical County of Zeeland, but a part of the County of Flanders initially ruled by the House of Habsburg. The region was front line in the Eighty Years' War and was conquered by the Dutch Republic in 1604. As such, it was the only part of Flanders, which took part in the insurgency, to become part of the new republic.

Zeelandic Flanders was subsequently ruled directly by the Dutch States General (parliament) as one of the Generality Lands and called Flanders of the States (Staats-Vlaanderen). After occupation by the French in 1795, the area accrued to the département of Escaut. Before the formation of the United Kingdom of the Netherlands in 1815, Zeelandic Flanders was territory of the Dutch province of North Brabant for a few years, but when the present province Zeeland was formed Zeelandic Flanders became a part of it, even after the 1830 Belgian Revolution that separated the remainder of Dutch Flanders from the Netherlands.

Disputes with Belgium
As Zeelandic Flanders was historically part of Flanders, demands/plans to annex it have been made by Belgium/Belgian politicians on multiple occasions.

A famous example would be Leopold II, who had made plans to invade the Netherlands before he became king. He planned to annex Limburg as well, and even had spies gain information on the Dutch military. He decided to abolish his plans after contacting France, who did not support it.

Another famous occasion was shortly after World War I. Belgium once again claimed both Zeelandic Flanders and Limburg, this time as a reconciliation. Even though the Netherlands was neutral in the war, Belgium felt the neutrality was a sign of support for Germany and suspected the Netherlands of collaborating with them.

Language
The native dialect of the western part of the region is Zeelandic Flemish, that can be considered a variety of both West Flemish and closely related Zeelandic. In the central regions, the Land-van-Axels and Land-van-Cadzands dialects of Zeelandic, itself a transition language between West Flemish and Hollandic, are spoken. In the eastern part, East Flemish with some Brabantian influence is spoken. Because some smaller areas were isolated by water, and thus being small islands, there are some dialects that differ slightly with the 'normal' dialect.

Notable people
 Lodewijk van den Berg, astronaut
 Willem Beukelszoon, inventor of gibbing
 Dick Dees, politician
 Jan Eekhout, author
 Jacques Hamelink, author and poet
 Willem van Hanegem, football player and coach
 Ate de Jong, director
 Annabel Kosten, swimmer
 Theo Middelkamp, professional cyclist
 Roelof Nelissen, politician and banker
 Jos de Putter, director
 Sandra Roelofs, First lady of Georgia (spouse of president Mikheil Saakashvili)
 Paul Tingen, writer, journalist, musician
 Kees Torn, comedian
 Mathilde Willink, society figure
 Herman Wijffels, Dutch administrator of the World Bank in Washington

See also 
Flanders
Western Scheldt
Zeeland

References

External links

 
History of Flanders
Regions of the Netherlands
Regions of Zeeland
Rhine–Meuse–Scheldt delta